Khlong Nakha is a wildlife sanctuary in southern Thailand, located in the southeast of Ranong Province. It is located within the hills of the Phuket mountain range.

It covers an area of 530 km², covering area of the tambon Chiao Liang, Ban Na and Bang Hin of Kapoe district, Nakha and Kam Phuan of Suk Samran, as well as tambon Khao Pang of Ban Ta Khun of Surat Thani Province.

The wildlife reserve was established in 1972, originally covering an area of 480 km². In 1991 50 km² of tambon Khao Pang were added to the reserve.

Sources
Forestry department (Thai only)
Royal Gazette entries for Khlong Nakha:
Issue 89, Part 82 (May 26 1975)
Issue 108, Part 162 (September 16 1991)

Geography of Ranong province
Wildlife sanctuaries of Thailand
Tenasserim Hills
Protected areas established in 1972
1972 establishments in Thailand